Baminnahennadige Dinakshie Priyasad (born 18 March 1990) (Sinhala: දිනක්ෂි ප්‍රියසාද්) is a Sri Lankan actress and television presenter. Priyasad made her acting debut at the age of two in the film Apaye Thathpara 84,000 directed by her father Dinesh Priyasad.

Early life
Dinakshie Priyasad was born in Colombo, Sri Lanka on 18th March 1990. She is the first of three daughters for Dinesh Priyasad and Shirani Priyasad. She and her family members are devout Catholics. Her father Dinesh is a film director, who pioneered various technologies and graphics to Sri Lankan cinema. His best known film being the 1995 action film Demodara Palama starring Gamini Fonseka. Dinakshie's mother has produced films directed by her father. Dinakshie has two younger sisters Sheshadri Priyasad and Shanudrie Priyasad, who are also actresses in Sri Lankan cinema and television.

Dinakshie attended the Holy Family Convent, Bambalapitiya up to the ordinary level (O/L) examination and completed her pre-university studies at the Royal Institute International School in the Maths Stream. Thereafter, she joined the Open University of Sri Lanka and is currently studying engineering for her Bachelor's degree. She is also doing her diploma in Media and Mass Communication at the University of Sri Jayewardenepura.

Career
Though it was in 1992 as a 2 year old that Dinakshie made her acting debut in her fathers film Apaye Thathpara 84,000. Her first major acting role came 2009 in the tele drama version of Upul Shantha Sannasgala’s renowned romantic novel Wassana Sihinaya. The teledrama was produced and directed by Janaka Siriwardana and Kavindya Jayasekara penned the script.

In 2009 she was seen in the teledrama Sanda Giri Pawwa portraying the main role of a teacher in a rural area. She has stated that this was her most challenging role she has portrayed as the character was a teacher who came from extreme poverty to excel in life and the sensitive emotions involved were challenging to depict. Also the filming were done in extreme harsh rural areas in the Kurunagala district. Her next teledrama was Hithata Wahal Weemi Sarath Kaviratne’s popular picture story that appeared in the Siththara weekly in the seventies. The teledrama was directed by Mohan Niyaz where Dinakshie portrays the character of Nimmi.

In year 2019, News4masses adjudged Dinakshie as the numero uno (No. 1) among the 'Most Beautiful Actresses and Models' in Sri Lanka.  Dinakshie happens to be one of the very few who rose to the top slot from the TV presenter and teledrama artists. 

Dinakshie has also appeared as the lead in four music videos by the artists Tehan Perera – Unuhuma, Prabudda Geetha Ruchi – Yahamin duka kiyaganna, Doctor Band – Aya Enathura and Billy Fernando – Ra Ahase. In 2021, she was cast to Raffealla Fernando Celebrity Calendar along with many other Sri Lankan celebrities.

Personal life
She started dating the popular Sri Lankan actor Saranga Disasekara since 2016. And they got married on 28th August 2020.
They welcomed their first child on 26th of September 2021.

Filmography

Television

Films

References

External links
 https://t.me/Dinakshielive
 Dinakshie Priyasad TV & Movie info on Sri Lankan Movie Databse
 දෙරණ ස්ටාර් සිටි 20 – 20 ජය අක්කානගෝට
සාරංග ඩිනක්ෂි එක්ව පොලීසියට පැමිණිල්ලක්
සාරංගයි ඩිනක්ෂියි මොකක්ද මේ ආරවුල

1990 births
Living people
Sri Lankan television actresses
People from Colombo
Sri Lankan female models
Sri Lankan film actresses
Alumni of the University of Sri Jayewardenepura
Alumni of Holy Family Convent, Bambalapitiya